Belagachhia is a census town in Cuttack district  in the state of Odisha, India.

Demographics
 India census, Belagachhia had a population of 4610. Males constitute 51% of the population and females 49%. Belagachhia has an average literacy rate of 74%, higher than the national average of 59.5%; with 56% of the males and 44% of females literate. 11% of the population is under 6 years of age.

References

Cities and towns in Cuttack district